Xanthodonta is a genus of moths of the family Notodontidae. The genus was erected by Max Gaede in 1928.

Species
Xanthodonta argyllacea Kiriakoff, 1961
Xanthodonta brunneata (Gaede, 1934)
Xanthodonta brunneifascia (Hampson, 1910)
Xanthodonta debilis Gaede, 1928
Xanthodonta diatrecta (Hampson, 1910)
Xanthodonta isabellina Kiriakoff, 1979
Xanthodonta lusingae Kiriakoff, 1954
Xanthodonta minima (Hampson, 1910)
Xanthodonta nigrovittata (Aurivilius, 1921)
Xanthodonta unicornis Kiriakoff, 1961
Xanthodonta xanthippa Kiriakoff, 1968

References

Notodontidae